John McGlashan College is a state integrated boarding and day school for boys, located in the suburb of Maori Hill in Dunedin, New Zealand. The school currently caters for  students from years 7 to 13, including 120 boarders and up to 30 international students.

The school is named after John McGlashan, a significant Presbyterian lawyer, politician, public servant and educationalist, and was founded after his daughters' gift of the family home and estate in 1918 on the provision that a Presbyterian school was established for boys.
Originally established as a Presbyterian private school, John McGlashan College integrated into the state system in 1989.

Boarding
John McGlashan College has two halls for boarding. Junior Hall (Ross House) is where the common room and bedrooms for year nine and ten boarders. Some housemasters also stay in Junior Hall. The newer Senior Hall (Balmacewen House) is where common rooms and bedrooms are for year 11, 12 and 13 boarders.

International Baccalaureate
John McGlashan College has been an IB World School since December 1999. It is the only school in Dunedin that offers the IB Diploma Programme.

In 2011, 4 female students studied at the college full-time. Their original school, private Anglican girls' school, St Margaret's College, had been damaged in the 2011 Christchurch earthquake. While being officially enrolled at nearby state integrated Anglican girls' school St Hilda's Collegiate School, the girls took classes at McGlashan as it was the only other IB school in the South Island.

International Exchanges
John McGlashan College has a relationship with Ichikawa Gakuen, a large private school near Tokyo, Japan. There is also an annual exchange with the Centre International de Valbonne and Lycée Regional Valbonne Sophia-Antipolis in France for those who take part in the French program at the college. The German Exchange is a nationwide exchange and is also supported by the college through its German program.

Sports
There is a wide range of sports available at the College, including rugby, soccer, cricket, tennis, hockey, softball, volleyball, basketball, trap shooting, yachting, skiing, badminton, and golf. The College is located next to the Balmacewen Golf Course, and the college encourages their students to join the golf club.

In recent years the College's 1st XV has been aided by an annual exchange with Whitgift School.

Houses
Every student upon arrival at the John McGlashan College is assigned to one of the four school houses. The houses compete in annually for the Elvidge Cup and the Minors Cup. The four Elvidge cup competitions are in the college athletics in term one, cross country in term two, the Haka competition in term three, and the college swimming sports in term four; all are compulsory for students to participate in. The interhouse Minors competition consists of golf, tennis, rugby sevens, Twenty20 cricket, soccer, hockey, table tennis, badminton, and volleyball. The houses are:

Balmacewen (Red) - Named for Isabella MacEwen, John McGlashan's wife.
Burns (Gold) - Named for Thomas Burns, an early settler and presbyterian minister
Ross (Blue) - Named for Lady Ross, an early benefactor to the college
Gilray (White) - Named for Colin Gilray, the longest serving principal of the college. The only non-original house of John McGlashan College.

Principals

Notable alumni

Charles Begg – radiologist and historian
Neil Begg – paediatrician, historian, and cricketer
John Davies – businessman and mayor
Tony Dodds – triathlete
Eion Edgar – businessman and philanthropist
Ron Elvidge – rugby union player
Andrew Hore – rugby union player
Hugo Inglis – field hockey player
Clarke Johnstone – equestrian
Neil Purvis – rugby union player
Michael Rae – cricketer
Murray Rose – politician
Dougal Stevenson – broadcaster
Edward Stewart – rugby union player
Hamish Walker – politician

See also
 List of schools in New Zealand

References

External links
 John McGlashan College Website
 Presbyterian Church of Aotearoa New Zealand
 
 John McGlashan College Sports Website

Boarding schools in New Zealand
Boys' schools in New Zealand
Educational institutions established in 1919
International Baccalaureate schools in New Zealand
Presbyterian schools in New Zealand
Secondary schools in Dunedin
1919 establishments in New Zealand